Peter Box (22 March 1932 – 15 August 2018) was an Australian rules footballer who played with Footscray in the Victorian Football League (VFL) during the 1950s.

Box arrived at Footscray from Cheltenham and made his VFL debut in 1951. 

He missed the entire 1952 season through injury after the motor cycle he was riding was hit by a car and he suffered critical head and leg injuries.

Box returned and played his best football from 1953 onwards. Although he was used mainly as a centreman, Box played at centre half-forward in Footscray's 1954 premiership side. By winning the Brownlow Medal in 1956 Box became the only Footscray premiership player to win the medal. The previous year he won his club's Best and Fairest award. 

Box played with Camberwell in the Victorian Football Association (VFA) in 1958 and won their best and fairest award.

Box was captain-coach with Grong Grong Matong Football Club in the South Western District Football League from 1959 to 1961 and won the 1959 South Western District Football League best and fairest award, the Gammage Medal.

Box then coached Narrandera Football Club in the South Western District Football League from 1962 to 1964 and later played in their 1966 premiership side.

Box returned to play with Grong Grong Matong Football Club from 1967 to 1969, to finish off a fine football career.

Box was inducted into the Footscray Hall of Fame in 2018.

Box was educated at Wesley College, Melbourne.

References

Links

1961 - South Western District FL team photo
1966 - South Western District FL Premiers: Narrandera Imperials FC team photo

Australian rules footballers from Victoria (Australia)
1932 births
2018 deaths
Western Bulldogs players
Western Bulldogs Premiership players
Brownlow Medal winners
Camberwell Football Club players
Charles Sutton Medal winners
Place of birth missing
People educated at Wesley College (Victoria)
One-time VFL/AFL Premiership players